Bandanpur is a village in Faizabad district of Uttar Pradesh state, India. It is 8 km away from the historical site of Sringirishi Ashram. Bandanpur is 40 km away from district headquarters Ayodhya city.

Bandanpur has its own local post office. Transportation is easily available, and there is a small market called Padua.

History 
A number of notable person were native of Bandanpur such as Ram Lal Tiwari, Shyam lal Tiwari, Janki Prasad Tiwari, Ram Kuber Tiwari, Ram Saware Tiwari, Jayanti Prasad Tiwari,Shyam Dhar Tiwari, Ram Aadhar Tiwari, Ram Aasre Tiwari,Hausila Prasad,Jwala Prasad Tiwari etc Some of them moved to Ahmedabad for occupation and worked with Cama motors, Textile Mills etc. Shyam lal Tiwari started working with Rustom Cama father of Jehangir Cama in a Automobile company, later Rustam cama started his own venture of automobile named Cama motors,after sometime Rustam Cama offered Shyam lal to join in his company, later he left Cama motors and joined Textile Jupiter Mill, and introduced Jayanti Prasad in Cama Motors. 
Shri Ram lal Tiwari worked with Mahatma Gandhi Navjeevan Press in his child hood and was having very good family relations with Kasturba Gandhi. He also been to Singapore for sometime,later worked in Jupiter Textile Mill. All these veterans with many other renowned residents of Bandanpur as well adjoining villages, cities raised fund for establishment of Jan Sewa Ashram Purva Madhyamik  Vidhyalay school in 1979 on Gram Samaj of Bandanpur,Jayanti Prasad Tiwari,the founder of the Jan Sewa Ashram Purva Madhymik Vidyalay school in 1979. Jayanti Prasad Tiwari was a social activist from Uttar Pradesh and was born in the village of Bandanpur to a well-known Brahmin Tiwari family. In 1932, at a young age, he moved to Ahmedabad and worked with Rustom Cama, a notable figure from Ahmedabad. He was unable to study during his childhood, therefore, as an adult, he decided to open schools and universities, beginning in his home village. Fundraising has allowed the foundation of the Jan Sewa Ashram schools. His death on March 28, 1983, is commemorated every year at his schools. 

Another example is Shri Jayanti Prasad Tiwari, who journeyed in 1932 from Bandanpur to Ahmedabad. During his journey, he helped many people find employment in various mills and other companies. It is claimed that after Tiwari began working with the late Khan Bahadur Rustom Cama at Cama Group, he took Mahatma Gandhi's ashes to Ahmedabad, and that after thirteen days after Gandhi's death, his ashes were immersed in the rivers and seas of the country.

Another notable figure is the late Shri Anantu Tiwari, who lost his life in the Indus Pak war.

Agriculture 
In Bandanpur, people are dependent on agriculture. Wheat, rice, sugarcane, mustard, and mangoes are the main crops.

Nearby villages and towns 
Bandanpur is within 5 km of the villages of Hardoiya, Aanapur Saraiya, Hardi, Khirauni, Khirauni, Amsin, Trilokpur, Samda, Maya Bazar, Mehbubganj and Goshainganj.

Educational institutions 
Jan Sewa Ashram, primary school
Maa Vidhyavasini Shikshan Seva Trust
Government Primary School
A.S. Public School
Pawan Public School
A.S. Memorial Degree College
Paavan Children Academy

Transportation 
Local taxi is available within 15 minutes.
The nearest bus station is also Goshainganj.

References 

Villages in Faizabad district